John II Clevland (1734 – June 1817) of Tapeley in the parish of Westleigh, Devon, was seven times Member of Parliament for Barnstaple from 1766 to 1802.

Origins
He was the eldest son of John I Clevland (1706–1763),  Secretary to the Admiralty from 1751 to 1763, and a Member of Parliament from 1741 to 1761.  His mother was Elizabeth Child, daughter of Sir Caesar Child, 2nd Baronet (c. 1678–1725).

Career
For most his career, Clevland worked in the Admiralty. He was seven times elected a Member of Parliament for Barnstaple from 1766 to 1802.

Marriage

In 1782 he married  Elizabeth Stevens (1727–1792), widow of Robert Awse of Horwood House, Frithelstock, and only surviving child of 
Richard Stevens (1702–1776) of Winscott in the parish of Peters Marland, Devon, Member of Parliament for Callington in Cornwall (1761–1768). The marriage was without progeny.

Succession
His heir to Tapeley and his other estates was his great nephew Col. Augustus II Saltren-Willett (1781–1849), JP and DL for Devon, who following his inheritance assumed in 1847 by royal licence the surname and arms of Clevland in lieu of Willett. He was the son of Augustus I Saltren-Willett (1760–1813) (who died at Tapeley in 1813 as his mural monument in Westleigh Church attests), builder of Port Hill House in Northam (visible across the River Torridge from Tapeley) the son of William Saltren (the second son of Thomas Saltren of Stone in the parish of Parkham) by his wife Hester Clevland, the eldest full-blood sister of John II Clevland (1734–1817).

Monument
A mural monument to his wife survives in Peters Marland Church inscribed as follows:
"To the memory of Mrs Elizabeth Clevland wife of John Clevland Esq., Member of Parliament for the Borough of Barnstaple (where he has been chosen six successive parliaments) and daughter of Richard Stevens of Winscott. She died 16 September 1792 aged 65 years"
Below is a white marble relief sculpted escutcheon showing the following arms: Quarterly 1st & 4th: Clevland; 2nd & 3rd: Vert, two bars engrailed between three leopard's faces or (Child baronets, of the City of London (1685) (Child of Surat, East Indies and Dervill, Essex, Baronet, created 1684, extinct 1753), the arms of William Clevland's mother Elizabeth Child). Overall is an inescutcheon of pretence of Stevens: Per chevron azure and gules, in chief two falcons rising belled or.

Sources
Lauder, Rosemary, Devon Families, Tiverton, 2002, pp. 41–5, Christie of Tapeley Park
Burke's Genealogical and Heraldic History of the Landed Gentry, 15th Edition, ed. Pirie-Gordon, H., London, 1937, p. 408, pedigree of Clevland, appended to pedigree of Christie of Tapeley Park and Glyndebourne, pp. 407–8
Burke's Genealogical and Heraldic Dictionary of the Landed Gentry, 1858, Volume 3, pedigree of Clevland of Tapeley
 Vivian, Lt.Col. J.L., (Ed.) The Visitations of the County of Devon: Comprising the Heralds' Visitations of 1531, 1564 & 1620, Exeter, 1895

References 

1734 births
1817 deaths
Members of the Parliament of Great Britain for Barnstaple
British MPs 1761–1768
British MPs 1768–1774
British MPs 1774–1780
British MPs 1780–1784
British MPs 1784–1790
British MPs 1790–1796
British MPs 1796–1800
Members of the Parliament of the United Kingdom for English constituencies
UK MPs 1801–1802
John